The A8 is one of Sydney, Australia's metropolitan arterial routes, formerly designated Metroad 10. The A8 route runs for 23 kilometres from North Sydney to Mona Vale. The route includes parts of several different roads.

The A8 is the main transport link through the Northern Beaches district of Sydney. It forms one of only three road connections between the Northern Beaches area  and the rest of Sydney (the others being the A3 and route A38 (Warringah Road)). The A8's crossing of Middle Harbour on the Spit Bridge has become infamous as one of the most congested road links in the city, made worse by the regular opening of the bridge to allow boats to pass by.

The A8 will eventually connect with the M8 in the Inner West via the Western Harbour Tunnel & Beaches Link, M4–M5 Link, and Rozelle Interchange.

Route
The A8 starts at the Warringah Freeway (M1) at North Sydney. The A8 route ends at the intersection of Pittwater Road and with Mona Vale Road (A3), at Mona Vale.

 Pittwater Road
 Condamine Street
 Burnt Bridge Creek Deviation
 Manly Road
 Spit Road
 Military Road

The majority of the A8 has three lanes in each direction. There are a few sections with only two lanes in each direction. None of the A8 route is a proper freeway, and it has intersections controlled by traffic lights every few blocks.

History
Most of the components of the A8 are old roads. The section of Military Road through Cremorne and Mosman was first built in the 1820s. The earliest bridge at The Spit, linking Mosman to Manly, opened in 1923, and was then rebuilt in the late 1950s with new, wider, approach roads on the southern (Spit Road) and northern sides (Manly Road) of the bridge. 

The passing of the Main Roads Act of 1924 through the Parliament of New South Wales provided for the declaration of Main Roads, roads partially funded by the State government through the Main Roads Board (later the Department of Main Roads, and eventually Transport for NSW). Main Road No. 164 was declared along this road on 8 August 1928, from the intersection of Great Northern Highway (today Pacific Highway) and Mount Street in North Sydney, via Cremorne, Balgowah, Dee Why, Narrabeen and Mona Vale to Newport.

The Burnt Bridge Creek Deviation opened in 1985 to bypass the congested Balgowlah shopping strip, offering 3 kilometres of almost freeway-grade motoring.

The route was signed State Route 14 across its entire length in 1974, continuing north of Mona Vale along Barrenjoey Road to Palm Beach. The majority of the route was then designated as Metroad 10 in 1998, between Artamon and Mona Vale, removing the former allocation along Barrenjoey Road. Traffic headed south-east on Warringah Freeway originally had no ability to exit the freeway to enter Falcon Street, so the original Metroad 10 route was extended further west via Pacific Highway to meet Gore Hill Freeway at Artamon. When north-facing, tolled off-ramps were constructed directly connecting Warringah Freeway to Falcon Street in 2007, Metroad 10 route was truncated back to Falcon Street.

With the conversion to the newer alphanumeric system in 2013, Metroad 10 was replaced with route A8.

Major intersections

Major roads and routes intersected along the A8 ( from south to north ) include:

The commencement of the A8 at the intersection of Falcon Street (A8) with the Warringah Freeway (M1) at North Sydney.
The junction of Spit Road and Military Road, at Mosman
The junction with Sydney Road and, indirectly, to the Wakehurst Parkway, at Seaforth
The junction with Condamine Street, at Balgowlah
The junction with Pittwater Road, at Brookvale
The junction with Warringah Road (A38), at Brookvale
The junction with the Wakehurst Parkway, at North Narrabeen
The junction with Mona Vale Road (A3) at Mona Vale, where the A8 ends

Military Road E-Ramp
A toll is charged when entering or exiting Warringah Freeway (north) to and from the A8 via the tolled E-ramps.  Known as the Military Road E-ramps and previously the Falcon Street Gateway, they were opened in 2007 and operated by Connector Motorways until 2010. They are now operated by Transurban under a toll concession until 2048.

See also

References

Sydney Metroads